Virgil Finlay: An Astrology Sketchbook is a collection of drawings by Virgil Finlay. It was published in 1975  by Donald M. Grant, Publisher, Inc. in an edition of 2,000 copies.  The book contains astrological art by Finlay with
introductions by Beverly C. Finlay and Robert Prestopino.

References

1975 books
Books about visual art
Donald M. Grant, Publisher books